The Truce of Adrianople in 1547, named after the Ottoman city of Adrianople (present-day Edirne), was signed between Charles V and Suleiman the Magnificent. Through this treaty, Ferdinand I of Austria and Charles V recognized total Ottoman control of Hungary, and even agreed to pay to the Ottomans a yearly tribute of 30,000 gold florins for their Habsburg possessions in northern and western Hungary. The Treaty followed important Ottoman victories in Hungary, such as the siege of Esztergom (1543).

Notes

Adrianople 1547
Adrianople
History of Edirne
Suleiman the Magnificent
16th century in Hungary
1547 in Europe
1547 in the Ottoman Empire
Adrianople 1547
Holy Roman Empire–Ottoman Empire relations
Eastern Hungarian Kingdom